Thomas Berney may refer to:

Sir Thomas Berney, 2nd Baronet (d. 1693) of the Berney Baronets
Sir Thomas Berney, 5th Baronet (d. 1742) of the Berney Baronets
Sir Thomas Reedham Berney, 10th Baronet (1893–1975) of the Berney Baronets

See also
Tom Birney
Berney (surname)